The following table presents a listing of Nigeria's 36 states ranked in order of their estimated total GDP in 2021.

References

GDP
Nigeria